Portal Resources for Indiana Science and Mathematics (PRISM) is a free website originally designed for Indiana middle school math, science, and technology teachers. It links Indiana Academic Standards for middle school science, technology, pre-engineering, and math (STEM fields) to appropriate, teacher-reviewed online learning activities. Users may either browse materials by academic standard or use the keyword search engine to find appropriate sites.

With the integration of the Moodle open source Learning Management System in 2006, PRISM now serves a much larger audience. Teachers from all grades may use Moodle to establish online classroom courses.

Typical PRISM reviewed resources include web-delivered simulations, visualizations, modeling packages, and resource sites providing access to live data or collaborative experiments. PRISM endeavors to encourage interactive learning, foster new liaisons among students, parents, and teachers, and foster alternative pedagogical approaches.

Membership in PRISM is free and is open to parents, teachers, and pre-service personnel. Student names and/or usernames are not displayed publicly on the site.

The PRISM Project is funded by a grant  from the Lilly Endowment and hosted at Rose–Hulman Institute of Technology (RHIT). PRISM is the West Central Regional Coordinator for the I-STEM Network.  Dr. Patricia A. Carlson (RHIT) is the Program Director of the project.

References

External links 
PRISM Website
Lilly Endowment Grant Supporting PRISM in Providing Digital Tools and Resources to Indiana K-12 Teachers
PRISM Becomes Go-To Resource for Indiana School Teachers

American educational websites
Mathematics websites
Rose–Hulman Institute of Technology